Scott Myles Edward Davies (born 10 March 1988) is an Irish professional football manager and player who played as a midfielder. He is currently manager of Slough Town.

Career

Early career
Born in Aylesbury, Buckinghamshire, and attending Aylesbury Grammar School, Davies started his career with Watford's youth system after being spotted whilst playing for the Aylesbury senior team.

In 2001, he moved to Wycombe Wanderers before moving to Reading in 2002. In September 2006, Davies joined Conference South side Yeading on loan, scoring the winning goal away at Ramsgate which saw Yeading go on to face Nottingham Forest.

Aldershot Town (loan)
Davies joined Aldershot Town on loan in summer 2007. He was given the number 16 shirt. He made his professional debut in the 2–1 win over Kidderminster Harriers on 11 August 2007, he also scored his first goal in the game. He then scored both goals in a 2–1 win over Histon.

At the end of 2007–08 season, Aldershot were promoted. He also won the Conference National goal of the season, with his injury time goal against Torquay United. Davies joined Aldershot for the second time on 23 July 2009.

He made his first Football League appearance in a 3–2 win over Bradford City on 30 August 2009, he also scored his first goal of the season.

Reading
He made his debut for Reading against Nottingham Forest on 8 August 2009. He made four more appearances before leaving on loan.

Wycombe Wanderers (loan)
On 16 October 2009, Davies signed a one-month loan deal with Wycombe Wanderers, making his debut in the 1–1 home draw with Colchester United on 17 October. In his third appearance, he scored two goals in their 3–2 home defeat against Walsall. On 4 January 2010 his loan was extended until 16 January.
On 16 March he joined Yeovil Town on a one-month loan deal, playing four games for the club before returning to Reading.

On 9 September 2010 Davies returned to Wycombe on a three-month loan deal.

Crawley Town
Davies was released by Reading at the end of the 2010–11 season and on 31 May 2011, he signed for League Two side Crawley Town on a free transfer. He made his debut against Macclesfield Town in a 2–0 win but after failing to get regular first team football he joined Aldershot Town on loan on 27 October 2011. He scored his first and only goal for Aldershot in a 2–1 loss to Gillingham on 19 November 2011. After playing just one game during the 2012–13 season Davies had his contract at Crawley terminated by mutual consent on 31 December 2012.

Oxford United
Davies was signed on non-contract terms by Oxford United on 1 March 2013. Manager Chris Wilder said of him "He's a player we think is definitely worth a look at. He has a very good pedigree and is someone we have kept an eye on for a while now so we are delighted that he has signed for us." He scored his first goal for the club in a 3–2 defeat at former club Aldershot Town on 1 April 2013. On 17 May 2013, Davies confirmed via his Twitter account that he had agreed a new one-year deal with the club, keeping him at Oxford until the end of the 2013–14 season. Davies was later released at the end of the contract and signed for Dunstable Town.

Non-League
During the summer of 2016, Davies joined Oxford City where he was named as captain.

On 30 May 2017, Davies signed for fellow National League South club Chelmsford City. On 19 March 2018, Davies left the club.

In the same month, Davies joined Slough Town. During his time at Slough, Davies helped the club to win promotion to the National League South via the Southern League play-off's. In February 2019, Davies left the club to sign for Kingstonian. In March 2019, after five games with Kingstonian, Davies joined Harlow Town owing to a managerial change at Kingstonian. On 9 March 2019, Davies made his debut for Harlow in a 3–1 home win against Kingstonian. Davies re-joined Slough in July 2019.

On 4 February 2020, Davies along with his teammate Louis Soares joined Southern League Premier Division Central side Biggleswade Town on loan.

The following week he joined Staines Town on dual registration.

Coaching and management career
On 23 November 2022, Davies was appointed manager of Slough Town having taken on the role of caretaker manager the previous week.

International career
Davies was called up to the Republic of Ireland under-21 squad to face Germany on 10 February 2009. However, he was an unused substitute in the 1–1 draw.

Personal life
Davies has studied for a degree in Professional Sports Writing and Broadcasting, and has written for The Non-League Paper. He has written about his long term gambling addiction from early in his career to 2015 where he estimates he lost over £200,000 whilst gambling, and his subsequent work educating other footballers around this subject.

Career statistics

Honours
Aldershot Town
Conference National: 2008

References

External links 
 Scott Davies profile at Oxford United F.C.
 
Scott Davies writes about his Gambling Addiction

1988 births
Living people
Sportspeople from Aylesbury
English footballers
Republic of Ireland association footballers
Association football midfielders
Association football forwards
Aylesbury F.C. players
Watford F.C. players
Wycombe Wanderers F.C. players
Reading F.C. players
Yeading F.C. players
Aldershot Town F.C. players
Yeovil Town F.C. players
Bristol Rovers F.C. players
Crawley Town F.C. players
Oxford United F.C. players
Dunstable Town F.C. players
Wealdstone F.C. players
Oxford City F.C. players
Chelmsford City F.C. players
Slough Town F.C. players
Kingstonian F.C. players
Harlow Town F.C. players
Biggleswade Town F.C. players
Staines Town F.C. players
Beaconsfield Town F.C. players
English Football League players
Southern Football League players
National League (English football) players
Isthmian League players
English people of Irish descent
Footballers from Buckinghamshire
Republic of Ireland football managers
Slough Town F.C. managers
National League (English football) managers